128 Circle is a Singaporean television series on Channel 5. It's the first multilingual drama TV series produced by Mediacorp.

Story 
The series tells the story of food vendors at 128 Circle food centre and their customers. They come from various ethnic backgrounds and reflect Singapore's passion for food.

Cast 
 Jitenram Kiran Bala as Arun
 Duan Weiming as Larry
 Lance Eminger as Mr. Peterson
 Sharon Ismail as Aishah
 Constance Lau as Audrey
 Jae Liew as Sherry
 Charlie Goh as Ethan
 Ashwini Nambiar as Rani
 Silvarajoo Parakasam as Chandra
 Chase Tan as Yi Kai
 Daren Tan as Dominic
 Peggy Tan as Ah Gek

Episodes

Season 1

Season 2

References

External links 
 Official website
 

Singaporean television series
2019 Singaporean television series debuts
Channel 5 (Singapore) original programming